Carneades is a genus of longhorn beetles of the subfamily Lamiinae.

 Carneades bicincta Gahan, 1889
 Carneades championi Bates, 1885
 Carneades delicia Bates, 1869
 Carneades glaucothea Bates, 1872
 Carneades grandis (Thomson, 1860)
 Carneades hemileuca Bates, 1881
 Carneades nigrosignata Aurivillius, 1926
 Carneades personata Bates, 1881
 Carneades princeps Bates, 1872
 Carneades quadrinodosa Aurivillius, 1902
 Carneades reticulata Bates, 1881
 Carneades superba Bates, 1869
 Carneades vittata Gahan, 1889

References

Colobotheini